Eugammon of Cyrene was an early Greek poet to whom the epic Telegony was ascribed. According to Clement of Alexandria, he stole the poem from the legendary early poet Musaeus; meaning, possibly, that a version of a long-existing traditional epic was written down by Eugammon. He is said to have flourished 567/6 BC.

References

Epic poetry collectors
Early Greek epic poets
6th-century BC Greek people
6th-century BC poets
Cyrenean Greeks
Year of birth unknown
Year of death unknown